Smith & Wesson is a 1988 Filipino action comedy film co-written and directed by Tony Y. Reyes. It stars Vic Sotto and Joey de Leon as the titular duo, alongside Beverly Vergel, Panchito, Paquito Diaz, Mon Alvir, Angela Luz, Jimmy Fabregas, Rene Requiestas, and Vangie Labalan. Sotto and de Leon are also the film's co-writers and producers. The film parodies both Miami Vice and Bloodsport, with the title in reference to the American firearm manufacturer of the same name.

Smith & Wesson was released by Viva Films on November 16, 1988. The film was praised by critic Lav Diaz for its playful mood and Requiestas' naturally comedic performance, though he criticized the demeaning treatment of women and little people.

Cast
Vic Sotto as Jessie Wesson of the Mayumi Vice Squad
Joey de Leon as James Smith of the Mayumi Vice Squad
Beverly Vergel as Beverly
Panchito as Major Mayumi
Paquito Diaz as Tio Pablo
Mon Alvir as Andy
Angela Luz as Angela
Jimmy Fabregas as Mr. Ayala
Rene Requiestas as Don Johnson Waks
Vangie Labalan
Ester Chavez as Mrs. Ayala
Spanky Rigor
Minnie Aguilar as a secretary
Bomber Moran
Tsing Tsong Tsai as Wang Tao
Ned Hourani as Logan
Tito Sotto
Val Sotto
Karen Sto. Domingo as a secretary
ER Canton Salasar as a detective
Bert Cayanan as a detective
Polly Cadsawan as a detective
Adonis Montemayor as a detective
Nemie Gutierrez as a detective
Ernie Forte as a Takusa man
Romy Romulo as a Takusa man
Joe Hardy as a Takusa man
Roger Moring as a Takusa man
Rey Tomenes as a Takusa man
Danny Rojo as a Takusa man

Critical response
Lav Diaz of the Manila Standard praised the film's playful "mood" and neat editing which easily supplies hilarity, giving special praise to Rene Requiestas' naturally comedic performance as a bumbling villain. However, he criticized the treatment of Angela Luz and Beverly Vergel's characters as eye candy, along with the continuous belittling of little people.

References

External links

1988 films
1980s action comedy films
1988 comedy films
Films shot in Hong Kong
Philippine action comedy films
Viva Films films
Films directed by Tony Y. Reyes